Vincent Raymond Yarbrough (born March 21, 1981) is an American former professional basketball player who played in the NBA and Europe.

The 6'7" and 210 lb forward out of the University of Tennessee was selected as the fourth pick of the second round (33rd overall) of the 2002 NBA Draft by the Denver Nuggets. He played 59 games with them during 2002-03 (his only season in the NBA), averaging 6.9 points, 2.7 rebounds and 2.2 assists per game.

Yarbrough's final NBA game was on April 16th, 2003 in a 84 - 89 loss to the Houston Rockets where he recorded 8 points, 9 rebounds and 8 assists.

Yarbrough also played with Oostende of the Belgian basketball league and in Italy with Sicilia Messina and Viola Reggio Calabria.

In the 2006–07 season, Yarbrough played for the German team Brose Baskets in Bamberg, Bavaria after signing for the team in July 2006.

In July 2008, Yarbrough was signed by Telekom Baskets Bonn for the 2008–09 season.

Notes

External links
Vincent Yarbrough playerfile @ NBA.com
NBA stats @ basketballreference.com
Player Profile @ Legabasket.it

1981 births
Living people
American expatriate basketball people in Belgium
American expatriate basketball people in Germany
American expatriate basketball people in Italy
American men's basketball players
Basketball players from Tennessee
BC Oostende players
Brose Bamberg players
Denver Nuggets draft picks
Denver Nuggets players
EWE Baskets Oldenburg players
McDonald's High School All-Americans
Riesen Ludwigsburg players
Parade High School All-Americans (boys' basketball)
People from Cleveland, Tennessee
Small forwards
Telekom Baskets Bonn players
Tennessee Volunteers basketball players
Viola Reggio Calabria players